Gino Brazil (born 28 March 1968 in Dublin, Ireland) is an Irish former footballer. He is currently working as a Football in Community Development Officer for the Football Association of Ireland.

A diabetic, Brazil played all his schoolboy football with Belvedere and then got an offer to sign for St Patrick's Athletic where he spent five months. After a period on the bench he dropped down a division and signed for Home Farm for two seasons.

After a spell at Finn Harps (3 League Cup appearances) he signed for Shamrock Rovers under Noel King in 1989. He made his Rovers debut against Derry City on Friday 10 December 1989. He went to spend almost twelve seasons at Rovers where he made 323 competitive appearances scoring twice. In light of the club's failure to award Brazil a well-deserved testimonial Rovers fans organised a testimonial dinner on Sunday 26 October 1997.

He played every game in the 1993/94 title winning year scoring once against Bohs on 26 September 1993 at the RDS Arena. Brazil was Rovers Player of the Year the following season (Shamrock Rovers#Player of the Year).

He made 4 appearances for Rovers in European competition.

In January 2001 Brazil signed for Athlone Town.

Honours 
 League of Ireland
 Shamrock Rovers – 1993/94
 FAI Super Cup
 Shamrock Rovers – 1998
Leinster Senior Cup
 Shamrock Rovers – 1997
SRFC Player of the Year:
 Shamrock Rovers – 1994/95

References

Republic of Ireland association footballers
Association football defenders
League of Ireland players
St Patrick's Athletic F.C. players
Home Farm F.C. players
Finn Harps F.C. players
Shamrock Rovers F.C. players
Athlone Town A.F.C. players
1968 births
Living people
Association footballers from Dublin (city)
Belvedere F.C. players